William John Lewis (16 October 1916 – 8 December 1991) was an Australian politician.

He was born at Penshurst and worked as a truck driver and postal worker before serving in the military during World War II. After his return he was a cartage contractor from 1947, and was president of the local branch of the Labor Party. He was elected to the Victorian Legislative Assembly in 1970 as the member for Portland, but was defeated in 1973. Lewis died in 1991.

References

1916 births
1991 deaths
Australian Labor Party members of the Parliament of Victoria
Members of the Victorian Legislative Assembly
20th-century Australian politicians